Aleksa Milojević (born 8 January 2000) is a Serbian football goalkeeper who plays for Mladost Novi Sad.

Club career

Jagodina

2015–16 season
Born in Jagodina, Milojević passed the youth school of club with the same name. He joined the first team roster for the spring half of 2015–16 season, at the age of 16. After Đorđe Nikolić injured, Milojević travelled to Antalya, where passed the preparations along with two other choices Lazar Tatić and Miroslav Stamenković, where he played some friendly matches for the winter break off-season. During the regular season, Milojević spent mostly matches as a reserve goalkeeper. He made his professional debut in the last fixture of 2015–16 Serbian SuperLiga against OFK Beograd, played on 21 May 2016, when he replaced Tatić in 61 minute of the match.

2016–17 season
After Nikolić and Tatić left the club in summer 2016, Milojević became the first choice goalkeeper at the beginning of new season. He started his first senior match on the field in the first fixture of the 2016–17 Serbian First League season, against Radnički Pirot when kept a clean sheet. In August 2016, Milojević signed his first three-year professional contract with club. Later, during the season, he was usually called into the national team and missed mostly matches in the Serbian First League. He also played with youth team as well.

International career
Milojević got a first call into the Serbia U17 national team squad for tournament played in Hungary in July and August 2016. Previously, he was a member of U15 and U16 teams between 2015 and 2016.

Career statistics

References

External links
 
 

2000 births
Living people
Sportspeople from Jagodina
Association football goalkeepers
Serbian footballers
Serbia youth international footballers
FK Jagodina players
OFK Bačka players
Serbian First League players
Serbian SuperLiga players
Serbia under-21 international footballers